Yuriy Solomka (born 4 January 1990 in Pokrovske, Dnipropetrovsk Oblast, Ukrainian SSR) is a former professional Ukrainian football striker who played for Veres Rivne.

Career
Solomka is a product of youth team system of UOR Donetsk.

Solomka spent his career in the different Ukrainian First League teams and on 10 July 2015 he signed a two years contract with the Ukrainian Premier League FC Chornomorets.

References

External links
 
 

1990 births
Living people
Ukrainian footballers
FC Tytan Armyansk players
FC Oleksandriya players
FC UkrAhroKom Holovkivka players
FC Chornomorets Odesa players
Ukrainian Premier League players
FC Helios Kharkiv players
FC Poltava players
FC Kolos Kovalivka players
FC Polissya Zhytomyr players
NK Veres Rivne players
Association football forwards
Ukrainian Second League players
Sportspeople from Dnipropetrovsk Oblast